Monster Man is a reality TV series shown on Syfy.

Plot
Monster Man follows the work and life of special effects artist Cleve Hall and his family as they work at SOTA F/X designing special effects for various projects. It was first broadcast in March 2012.

Episodes

References

External links
 
 

Special effects
Syfy original programming
2012 American television series debuts
2010s American reality television series
English-language television shows
2012 American television series endings